Chrysauge latifasciata is a species of snout moth in the genus Chrysauge. It was described by Warren in 1891. It is found in Brazil.

References

Moths described in 1891
Chrysauginae